Karacık can refer to:

 Karacık, Araç
 Karacık, Bismil